This is a list of characters from George Lopez.

Main characters

George Lopez
George Edward Lopez (played by George Lopez) is the main protagonist of the series. He is the son of Manny and Benny Lopez. George married Angie Palmero right out of high school and had two children, Carmen and Max. George is of Mexican descent and proudly boasts about it several times throughout the series, though he occasionally makes jokes about it as well. In the pilot episode, "Prototype," George gets promoted to manager of Powers & Sons Aviation (usually seen as Powers Bros.), an airplane parts factory. He is also dyslexic, which often comes into play on the show. His son, Max, also has dyslexia, but a more severe case than his father. George also loves to play golf and he usually does it whenever he gets out of situations and to outsmart his family, like listening to Carmen's poetry or talk about Max's dyslexic problems.

George had a troubled childhood which is referenced throughout the series. His mother, Benny was neglectful and verbally abusive, which took a toll on George's childhood. George initially believed Manny, his father, was dead (which was what Benny told him so he would stop asking where his father was), but learned he was actually alive from Manny's sister and George's aunt, Cecelia. When Manny sends George a check to help him out of financial trouble, George goes to see him in Phoenix, and ends up punching him in Benny's honor (the first gift Benny actually wanted from him). Benny is incensed at this, but decides to accept it for George's sake. At Thanksgiving dinner later that year, Manny is revealed to need a kidney transplant, so George offers to donate his kidney. Manny dies before this can happen. George gets a package with a gold watch and a letter from Manny asking him not to come to his funeral to avoid ruining his reputation. Furious and emotional, George destroys the watch, not knowing that it is worth a fortune until Benny tells him it must have been worth a lot more than when she was with Manny.

At the start of the series, he and Angie were very much in love. But as the series progresses, their marriage becomes more and more competitive, disputing on issues such as who's a better parent or who does more work in the house. George often backs down from his wife, which prompts Benny to tease him on the inevitable fact she's actually the "man" in their marriage.  This is often demonstrated when a particularly challenging situation arises and rather than admit that he is in over his head, George will quote in a very high-pitched voice, "I got this!", or when he thinks an idea is crazy or stupid, or when he clearly knows someone is joking about something, he will usually quote "Está loco!..", usually followed or preceded with the crazy idea or joke (example: "I enjoyed meeting your mother'? Está loco! 'I enjoyed meeting your mother'."). At serious points in the series, he has tried to set Angie straight but she's always managed to either outsmart him or avoid the problem completely by pointing out some other problem. In one episode, it is learned that Angie once fell in love with him because of a mural Angie that George claims to have made. But Angie eventually finds out that George didn't really paint it. Despite all this, Angie still loves him. It has also been heavily implied that Angie's typical housewife status and inability to get a decent well-paying job is because George is the one who kept her from going to college and obtaining a degree. It's also been revealed that George got Angie pregnant before they got married, meaning that their first-born Carmen was conceived outside of marriage.

Throughout the series, George demonstrates several times how self-righteous and uncaring he is of Angie, such as in "George's Extreme Makeover: Holmes Edition", where George promises to renovate the garage into an office space for Angie, but resorts to paying a couple of his old friends to do it with "a couple of cases of beer".  Or in "George Nieces a New Video Room", where Veronica's ex-boyfriend leaves her a giant stuffed animal in the backyard and George says that he will use it as Angie's anniversary gift and then says ("Now that doesn't mean you won't get that set of diamond earrings you asked for - but you're not...").  Angie was most upset, though, in the season 3 episode "Mementos", where George proves he has failed to listen to her and throws an irreplaceable box of her grandmother's mementos away while spring cleaning, and this spawns an entire list of occasions in which his failure to listen to Angie at an earlier time (usually not seen by the viewers) comes back to haunt him in one of the episodes. (George, however, defends himself by saying if she's told him repeatedly, he's obviously not a very good listener) George can also tend to forget Angie's birthday or their anniversary, such as in "George of the Ring", where Angie points out that he actually forgot three days ago. In the end, though, he always comes through with getting gifts.

George's character also goes through a big change over the course of the series. In the beginning, he was depicted as a patient man, devoted father and husband. But as the series progresses, he becomes increasingly more arrogant, seemingly difficult, and becomes more-and-more competitive with Angie and Benny. Even so, he still loves his family and cares for them, even if he doesn't show it as often as before.

George's relationship with his mom revolves around insulting each other, briefly complimenting each other, and insulting each other some more. Benny constantly teases George about not being the man of the house, his big head, his failures as a child. George retaliates by teasing her about her short stature, her age, and her inability to maintain a single man for more than a day. George often refers to his mother as "a crazy old bat". In "God Needles George", he shares the beginning of a speech he saved for Benny's death; the beginning of his speech was "The reason I'm drinking champagne is because...". At another time, when Benny said she would never see George again after an argument, George said he would (when he's called to identify Benny's dead body)- "That's her. She's cold. So let's... wrap her around the keg and start this party!" Though aside from all this, they both truly love each other. A prime example is when George believed his mom died in a house fire and was genuinely anxious. He was even willing to run into the burning building to save her if it weren't for a firefighter holding him back. He even said "My mom's been training for this; she's been smoking three packs a day for years!" to try calming himself.

As a boy, George enjoyed playing guitar and baseball; in his teens he started a heavy-metal band with Ernie, and other friends called "Dos Bad Asses"; they won battle of the bands at school by lighting their instruments on fire, but only the first round and making the curtains in the auditorium fire-poof. Throughout grade school, he and Ernie had the reputation of being outcasts or "unpopular". At one point, George learned Angie's ex-boyfriend dumped her before meeting him, making him think she "dropped a level" so she wouldn't get dumped again. However, it is later revealed Vic paid him off to do so (with George joking that he'd leave Angie if he got paid $200,000). He is also an avid sports fan of teams such as the Oakland Raiders, the Los Angeles Lakers, and the Los Angeles Dodgers. George often buys expensive jerseys of the teams and wears them on his days off. Carmen insults him about buying jerseys in her diary, saying because he doesn't play for them, George should stop buying the jerseys.

Angie Lopez

Angelina "Angie" Lopez (née Palmero) (Constance Marie) is the daughter of Vic and Emilina Palmero, sister of Gloria and Ray Palmero, wife of George, daughter-in-law of Benny, and mother of Carmen and Max. In Season 2 she takes a job selling health and beauty products to help pay for Carmen's private school tuition. She lost her job early in Season 4 and became a wedding planner.

Unlike George's tough childhood, Angie had a spoiled upbringing, which sometimes causes friction between herself and George. She was a cheerleader in high school and was very popular. Benny often calls her "princess" sarcastically due to her being spoiled, and the two don't get along well. Angie is considerably softer and more forgiving as a parent, unlike her husband who is quick to come down hard on their kids. Angie is very overprotective of Max and supportive of Carmen. She is also portrayed as a goody-two-shoes, very naive, and often takes people at face-value. Several times in the series George has had to prove to her that people were lying or being insincere. Her compassion for others not only annoys George, but often backfires. Despite this, Angie was extremely whip-smart.

Angie usually outsmarted George and had disrespected him in front of their children. Due to this, Benny is disgusted at what her son George has been reduced to, which further causes her to dislike Angie. Angie is also not above bullying George around with his power around the house. She disapproves of the constant fighting between George and Benny and consistently tries to mend fences between them. In the episode "George Discovers How Mescal-ed Up His Life Would Have Been Without the Benny-Fits", Angie sides with Benny when George prevented her from winning a contest at work. She's also been described as a bad cook by mainly Benny and sometimes George. This may be because she was pampered like a princess during her childhood. A bit of a running gag in the series is whenever George says something that upsets Angie, he tries to make up an excuse for his actions while trying to kiss her wrist. Angie responds by pulling away and giving him a disgusted look. Another running gag is that whenever George is angry at her for something, such as a kept secret, she usually resorts to selling him her body in order to avoid consequence. Another running gag in the series is her hitting George at least once an episode after he says something she doesn't want to hear or something that she believes is too inappropriate in front of the kids. Also, despite being a housewife, Angie is rarely shown doing any house work in the series especially during the later seasons, heavily implying that she hardly ever does any work at all.
Another notable fact about her marriage with George is their infatuation with each other. George seems to be very infatuated with Angie when she doesn't speak while Angie rarely ever shows a slightest bit of infatuation with him. Throughout the series, this has been heavily implied but never implicitly said. For example, whenever they have the house to themselves, George usually recommends they go upstairs and have sex. Angie on the other hand would much rather not and instead do some other activity. She once even ordered George to put up a shelf in Max's room rather than sleep with him. George pathetically tried to counter it by asking her "You sure it's not because you want to see me with my tool belt?" But it was clear to the audience that he was pathetically trying to convince himself that he's attractive to his wife.

For her part, Angie will side with George against her father Vic, and will always help her husband no matter what problem he has. Angie is a know-it-all who always thinks that George, is wrong, but there have been multiple times when she has to apologize to him.

Carmen Lopez

Carmen Consuela Lopez (Masiela Lusha) is the daughter of the Lopez family; Max's older sister; granddaughter of Vic, Benny, Emelina and Manny. She talks like a valley girl. She is very melodramatic, always displays superior intelligence and a love of writing laughably dramatic, dark, or melancholy poetry. However, her judgment of right and wrong is not always the best, and she has performed daring acts of defiance against her parents' wishes if she feels the urge to protest against supposed injustices in her parents' orders or security in a certain environment. Carmen loves poetry and romance. Unfortunately this has left her quite easy to manipulate, as her search for true love and acceptance from her peers blinds her to a person's true nature. She usually has been misled through someone else's deception or by her own desires (such as when she ran away from home with the womanizing Zach Powers and later insisted upon re-decorating her bedroom symbolically in order to match with her supposed maturity). Carmen often shows a liberal bent to political issues (even more than others in her household) and has an affinity for social justice causes. However, George frequently underestimates Carmen's intelligence and has little faith in her, sometimes apparently perceiving her as dim and airheaded (similar to how Benny sees Carmen as a future stripper). Aggravated by her parents' limits, Carmen often performs acts of rebellion against them as a means of proving her maturity and independence, albeit her father often fears for her virginity. Towards the conclusion of the series, Carmen left for college and the role filled by her character was replaced through the addition of her snobbish, overindulged, wealthy cousin Veronica, whose trust fund has been left in George's care after the death of her mother and who debuted shortly before Carmen's departure.

Like Angie, Carmen has unrivaled beauty. This made her a source of jealousy among other girls her age and leaves her with few friends, thus leaving her with extremely low self-esteem. Her parents pulled her out of public school and placed her in a private one (at considerable expense), only to have similar problems follow her there. Though when Carmen was no longer affected by this, it's left questionable as to why she was not put back in public school.

Carmen has dated a multitude of boys, most notably Zach Powers, and a member of the high school football and baseball teams, Jason McNamara.  Jason came to live with the Lopez family briefly while he trying to earn a football scholarship. He was known for his on-again-off-again romance with Carmen. Despite his usually good-natured personality, he had been known to cheat on her and break up with her constantly in exchange for different and more experienced girls.  Many episode plots were established through his stay in the Lopez household. However, Carmen's second most notable relationship was the one that she shared with Zach Powers, the vandalistic, despicable, loathsome, lawless, womanizing teenage son of George's boss. Carmen was convinced that the pair genuinely was falling in love.  In reality, Zach was only trying to lure her into having sexual intercourse before dumping her.  George was infuriated by his actions and Zach admitted his intentions to George during a confrontation. Carmen boldly defended Zach against her mother and father's claims of his true intentions.  She rebelliously fled to San Francisco with him against George and Angie's wishes in one episode. Eventually she admitted that her parents were right all along about Zach when she confessed that he had dumped and ditched her in a nightclub shortly after she refused to sleep with him at a hotel he had taken her to. Carmen doesn't exactly have good taste in men; she often falls for the handsome popular jock with a sob story.

Max Lopez
Maximilian Victor Roberto Magic Johnson "Max" Lopez (Luis Armand Garcia) is George and Angie's second-born child and only son, Carmen's younger brother and Vic, Benny, Emelina and Manny's grandson. Angie could not choose between the first three names while George wanted their son named after someone famous. Max is an avid skateboarder.

Max thinks the world of his father and is very close to him, part of which is due to their shared disability. For one Halloween, Max was asked what superhero he wanted to dress up as, and he said it was George; this shows how greatly Max appreciates his father. Max also shares George's sense of humor and will make decisions based on his father's actions. They both share a hatred for Carmen. Whenever he torments his sister, George will usually enable and/or encourage his behavior. Much like George is overprotective of Carmen, Angie is overprotective of Max, and sees him as her little boy just like any stereotypically overprotective mother.

Like his father, Max suffers from dyslexia, which is a lot more severe than George's dyslexia. Max's learning disabilities were so bad that he nearly failed the 5th grade, but managed to avoid this. In Season 3 he went through several tutors until Jason started tutoring him, which helped him significantly. He also suffered from insomnia at one point due to the stress of having to work harder than anyone due to his dyslexia, so Vic suggested he take up boxing to help him cope with anxiety. But George knew Angie wouldn't let him so they did it behind her back. After getting a black eye (from taking off his boxing glove wrong), Angie found out. George and Angie agreed that he would not box anymore, and resolved to help him deal with his stress; George later implied he was lying and would make Angie handle it alone. It's been implied that one of the reasons Max didn't do too well at school is George and Angie's constant arguing which makes it hard for him to concentrate on his studies, though his parents don't seem to care or even attempt to change even after Max practically broke down informing them of this, though it was implied he simply used it as an excuse in order to explain his getting a D in history at the time.

Although he doesn't have Carmen's low self-esteem, he succumbs to peer pressure, and does outlandish things such as dyeing his hair purple, telling Benny to "take her tired ass home" (and being slapped in the face), and giving his garage to a band. Max once ended up in the hospital for alcohol poisoning after drinking grain alcohol mixed with fruit punch at a party. He easily gives in to peer pressure mainly because he got bullied in grade school (much like George used to) which prompted him to believe that he must follow the crowd in order to avoid being tormented.

As Max grew into a teenager, a number of problems made George begin to seriously doubt his son's capability, intelligence and overall future after leaving education.

His relationship with his parents is portrayed as much more friendly than the one with Carmen. Though they sometimes go through hardships trying to cope with his dyslexia, they never really have too many problems together. George always gives Max advice on how to deal with hardships he himself dealt with when he was Max's age while Angie gives him sympathy and unsuccessful advice mainly because she never dealt with the kind of problems Max deals with. Max naturally goes with George's advice because he can actually compare himself to George much more than Angie. Max and George had a close relationship together as father and son at the beginning of the series but as the series progressed and Max became a teenager, their relationship together became more estranged. Max took on a more selfish attitude mainly from George's part and begins to make decisions based on his own insight rather than George's, which is seen towards the end of season 5 and beginning of season 6.

Benny Lopez

Benita "Benny" Diaz Lopez (Belita Moreno) is George and Linda's mother, Angie's mother-in-law, and Carmen and Max's paternal grandmother; a wise-cracking, outspoken, insensitive alcoholic who was responsible for George's frequently-mentioned traumatic childhood. Conceiving him in the back of a car wash after engaging in premarital sexual relations with Manny Lopez, Benny wed her lover shortly afterward, only for Manny to divorce her during George's infanthood. After convincing George that his father had died, Benny showed her son an abusive, dysfunctional home life and childhood, desensitizing him to her constant criminal actions as if they were any normal occurrences, guarding numerous other secrets from her son as well that were unveiled during his adulthood.

Many episode plots had often been established through George's discovery of a protected secret, such as the revelation of his having a sister named Linda (who had enjoyed a far more loving childhood after Benny had given her up for adoption), and many jokes had been brought up referencing one of Benny's numerous acts of child abuse directed toward George and mistreatment of him. Unloving, cold, and uncaring, Benny had shown George no compassion or affection of any kind during his childhood, leading him to seemingly detest her for her utter lack of empathy. However, it has been revealed that Benny secretly does love her son; some reasons relating to her secrecy and deprivation of multiple privileges toward George were out of protection and worry for him. However, she is most frequently depicted as being cynical and cold-hearted; she taunted her little son for his undiagnosed dyslexia and showed him no encouragement of any kind at all, exposing him to criminal activity, gang disputes, and riots during his very earliest years of life. Stubborn, Benny often hates to admit her mistakes, accept apologies, or reconcile with others, and her relentless alcoholism and strong addiction to smoking is frequently poked fun at by her disrespectful son.

In response to years of the abuse that George has put up with her, a common theme throughout the series is George referring to Benny in some demonic shape or form or when he won the award for manager of the year, he proudly stated, "And to my mother, I wish she'd lived to see this day but I know she's down there looking up at me and she's saying "Oh my flesh is burning! Ah!"; an example of what he thinks of her and her actions. (He clearly thinks Benny is going to hell when she dies.)

Usually, whenever she sees a family member she held a grudge against, they usually greet her with, "Hello Benita." However it is revealed  in "Why You Crying? " that Benny was in turn raised in an abusive environment. She told Max "What we called discipline is now called child abuse".

Ernie Cardenas

Ernesto "Ernie" Cardenas (Valente Rodriguez) has been George's best friend since the second grade. Ernie is a former co-worker. He works on the assembly line at Power Bros. Aviation, he started as a regular worker who later on became the Assembly Line's Team Leader. He is an incompetent, big-eared, clumsy, dim-witted, but loyal and lovable character. He is often very shy around women and cannot seem to ever get a date due to his awkwardness and overall inability to connect with women, let alone talk to them. He has a huge crush on Angie, and can often be seen hitting on her, much to George's distaste. He claims to be jealous of George's life. His mother is morbidly obese, and lots of jokes are made about her, especially by George and Benny (and sometimes Angie). He used to live with his parents until George inspired him to get his own apartment. He's also a foster father to Max's best friend, Ricky.

Ernie is depicted as silly, socially awkward, and very loyal to George. He is often at George's house conversing with the family and has very few other friends. He consistently strives to pick up women but to no avail. Flashbacks are made to when George and Ernie were friends and classmates in grade school. He likes everyone in the family except for Benny, who sometimes barks at him due to his personality.

It was said in one episode that he was apparently born in a bathtub, due to his mom being overweight and she apparently didn't even know she was pregnant with Ernie. George adds to this by replying that Ernie's mother sneezed and he "popped out to her shoulders".

At one point, he was engaged to Ricky's mom Tammy because she was pregnant with another man's baby and he wanted a family. Later, they broke up because Tammy still wanted to sleep around when she and Ernie got married. His catchphrase is "Golly!". One joke was made by George when Ernie asked if George listens to his voicemail. ("I don't listen to any of your messages. You call me every time you see a hot girl and then you take up five minutes of my voicemail going 'George! George! George!'") Ernie's inept social skills and inability to talk to women is obviously a result of the over sheltered childhood he had and his parents own problems rubbing off on him. Ernie is somewhat envious of George because although they grew up together, George's life led to a beautiful wife with two children and him being manager, while Ernie gained no such thing and has been on the manufacturing floor for almost 30 years. On Lopez Tonight, the real George Lopez stated that he had a best friend named Ernie in real life who he based the character off of.

Vic Palmero

Dr. Victor "Vic" Garcia Lantigua Palmero (Emiliano Díez) is Angie's wealthy father, Emilina's ex-husband, George's father-in-law, and Carmen, Max, and Veronica's grandfather.  He is a Cuban immigrant who became rich as a cardiac surgeon when he arrived in America. In the episode where Carmen wants to get birth-control pills for safe sex, Vic says that he lost his virginity in a field "with the sound of revolution in the background." When Angie's boyfriend before George seemed only to be attracted to Angie because of her looks, Vic paid him to end their relationship to teach her "that attraction was just physical, that looks don't matter"; this leads to her marrying George. ("Evidently, the lesson sunk in").

George is often annoyed by his stories about Cuba and his expressions, earning comical, sarcastic remarks. Originally, Vic strongly disapproved of Angie marrying George (In "A Kiss is Just a Kiss," it was revealed that as he walked Angie down the aisle on her wedding day he told her to leave George), even saying "when you make waffles, you always toss out the first one"; he later said he tailored his message to the moment as he told his other daughter "don't let this one go". He eventually accepts George as a good match for his daughter, as his son and other daughter's marriages ended in failure while Angie is still married. His wife, Angie's mother Emilina, cheated on him by having a prolonged affair and they divorced early in season 3. (Vic says he learned of it when "Last week I went to her dermatology clinic to surprise her. And I walked in on her checking a man for moles in a place where sun damage is not a possibility!").

He has a brother, Octavio Palmero. Vic, George, and Ernie went out to the Atlantic Ocean to pull Octavio out of the ocean and bring him to American soil as a surprise anniversary gift from George to Angie. Vic and Octavio later get drunk and brag about kicking Fidel Castro's butt. While they are talking, George bursts through the door dressed as Castro, and shouts in a thick Cuban accent: "It's Go Time!" scaring the living daylights out of Vic and Octavio, who angrily pursue him.

Vic later became engaged to 27-year-old Lindsay Cafferty (Stacy Keibler), but later discovered she was cheating on him with a younger man. He decided to return to Emilina, who had indicated that she wanted him back; unfortunately, she died before they could reunite. Vic despises Fidel Castro; in Carmen's Dating, when George tells him that Castro died, he is irrepressibly thrilled. He speaks with a thick Cuban accent which George often mocks; George has stated that Vic's heavy Cuban accent makes every sign sound angry. Vic was shown to have a romantic interest in Benny, even kissing her a few times in a way more intense than that of "just in-laws," even calling her his "little devil." He also says "oye chico" or "Cuba" or "Castro" and George tells him in one episode that he will have to pay him $1 to say those words in his house. Vic does not care. He starts to say all those words and dropping dollar bills everywhere, before he says "what-cha" (George's catchphrase) to George in his own house. One of his catchphrases is "Ay Dios Mio" meaning "Oh My God" in Spanish. He has two daughters and one son. He hates his despicable son Ray and tries to keep Ray's daughter Veronica from taking after him.

Veronica Ann Palmero

Veronica Ann Palmero (Aimee Garcia) is George and Angie's wealthy, spoiled niece, whose trust fund was left under George's care after the passing of her mother. George attempts to teach Veronica responsibility by helping her find a job in the factory, though his efforts are often thwarted when Veronica seduces the male workers (particularly Ernie and Mel Powers) into carrying out her duties for her. Other attempts at educating Veronica in responsibility before leaving her inheritance in her care include her enrollment at college, where she begins a romance with her married professor, who stalks her after their relationship ends. Veronica's trust fund is jeopardized by her self-serving, cold-hearted, manipulative father in an attempt to rob his daughter of her inherited wealth, resulting in the freezing of her account. Veronica's charms often play a key role in earning her what she wants, enticing men into filling out her wishes, much to the jealousy of her aging aunt in one episode, fearing for her reputation as the family's main beauty. Veronica is a talented poker player; in Season 6 she beats Ernie, George, and Vic in a game.

George's son Max is attracted to her, saying he loves her. She laughs this off, but learns not to take a shower when Max is home, as she found him in the hamper once. George warns him, "She's your first cousin; you have dyslexia. If you have kids with her, your mom and I will have to pay a dollar to visit our grandkids at the carnival."

Recurring characters

Amy
Amy (Sandra Bullock) is a recurring character (appearing in three episodes in total) who is nicknamed Accident Amy, because she is accident-prone. Whenever Amy shows up, Ernie says "Hey look, it's Accident Amy! Breakin' bones and breakin' hearts." After one bad accident, Amy loses her vision; she also appears wearing glasses and thrusting her hands out trying to identify people who speak to her. It was found out that she and Randy McGee were dating before he started dating Benny. Before Randy and Benny got married, Amy showed up at Randy's bachelor party and told Randy to leave Benny at the altar. Amy's first appearance occurs at the plant when she returns from breaking her arm. She has a daughter, Kimmy, who is also accident-prone. Amy states that her family has a slight depth perception problem. Bullock executive produced the show; normally a film actress, Bullock's three episodes as Amy are her only television acting credits in the twenty-first century.

The Powers Brothers
Jack and Mel Powers (Jack Blessing and Mark Tymchyshyn) are the co-presidents of Powers Brothers Aviation, the airplane manufacturing factory that employs George, Benny, and Ernie. Mel is the father of Zack Powers, a delinquent teenager who has a cold relationship with George because he used to date Carmen. Mel is said to be a womanizer; he often hires female managers and at one point he dates Veronica. A third brother, Lou, is also co-owner of the company but estranged from his brothers. Lou drinks often and is described as being more "caring" for the workers by promoting better quality health care. Occasionally, Jack and Mel will make racial comments towards George such as calling him 'amigo' and 'Senor Pumpkin Head.'  In the series finale, Jack and Mel eventually end up being bought out for the factory and announce they are co-presidents at a similar airplane factory in Cancun, leaving the factory to George. Jack and Mel are usually looked down upon by most other aviation companies mostly because their father started the business and since they inherited it the company has gone down the tubes somewhat and they constantly prove they are simply not the men their father was.

Jason MacNamara
Jason MacNamara (Bryan Fisher) is Carmen's boyfriend during seasons 3 and 4: popular, athletic, handsome, charming and smart. When he first started dating Carmen, she was new at school and the two of them agreed not to show their relationship publicly to avoid the popular girls picking on Carmen. His younger brother, Eric, is in a wheelchair. His father (played by Stacy Keach) pressured him into taking steroids to enhance his athletic abilities. He and Carmen broke up at one point because he was cheating on her with a girl who was "more experienced," but he managed to win her back by using his charm and way with words at a Debate Club meeting which they both participated in. He ran away from Carmen to pursue a baseball career after she tried to pressure him into having a baby so they could get married. He almost constantly clashes with George because George constantly accuses Jason to be lustful for Carmen, despite the obvious fact that she lusts for him. Though George may be aware of this, he still prefers to accuse Jason possibly because he can't accept the fact that it's his daughter that's lustful for Jason. George eventually and successfully negotiated Jason's pro baseball contract with the Washington Nationals farm team, the Savannah Sand Gnats. Jason was abandoned by his parents, so George and Angie took him in. His last appearance was in season 5 Jason  became very uncomfortable with Carmen trying to have a child with him as the very next day he left and told Max that he will see him someday. This results in Carmen being devastated, as he left California to pursue his baseball career. According to George, Jason may have a new girlfriend who is thought to be Asian or African American. It is also implied he lives with his parents in Switzerland.

Randy McGee
George's employee.  Randy (Nick Offerman) used to date Benny. They broke up once because Randy wanted to take it to the next level but Benny didn't. They got back together in the same episode, during which Randy proposes and Benny finally relents and says yes. Randy leaves Benny at the altar to be with Amy, his former love interest, but returns and begs her to take him back. Benny accepts, but later claims to leave Randy because he bored her.

Marisol
Marisol (Tonantzin Esparza) begins as an ex-gang member participating in one of Angie's gang rehab projects, which happens to be teaching dog grooming. Marisol laments that she doesn't want to be a dog groomer and envision herself with a classier job, such as working in an office, to which Angie responds by encouraging George to hire her at Powers Brothers for a trial period. She is known for having an attitude problem and for being very rude to people. When George was talking to Angie he says,"You remember the guy we fired that came back and tried to shoot up the place? He had a better attitude!" Her most famous line is, "I know, huh?" and "Ay, What are you looking at?" She has told Ernie directly on the first encounter that he has big ears, told George that he has a big head, and she answered the office telephone "Hello, Powers Brothers Aviation. How can I help your ass?" when Max's school called. She also took personal calls at work. Benny likes the way Marisol treats people ("She's like you, Mom, but with estrogen."). She got George in trouble with the Powers Brothers for not responding to important calls. She took Carmen to a club past midnight and got her grounded, although she had good intentions and was only helping Carmen stand up to mean kids who were teasing her just like in her old school.  After taking Carmen out to a club, she is kicked out and ends up with Benny.  At first, she and Benny do not seem to get along, but then they realize that they have so much in common.  She was last seen cleaning up in Benny's house.

Gina Sorenstam
Gina Sorenstam (Elmarie Wendel) is an employee at Powers Brothers Aviation. Viewing herself as sexually-appealing and erotically-charming, Gina's main character hallmarks of her countless attempts at charming her male co-workers and at sex appeal are often the object of ridicule. In one episode she was hired as a stripper as a gag during Randy's bachelor party, only for Amy to interfere with her performance in an attempt to win back Randy's affections. Gina and Benny are frenemies, and at one point an implication was hinted that she may be bisexual.

Zack Powers
Zack (played by Trevor Wright) is Mel's son and Jack's nephew. He is shown to be quite rebellious and never listening to his father. It is stated that he was kicked out of school, vandalized the factory (in the episode "Wrecking Ball") and got a girl pregnant at a previous school, simply to infuriate the principal. He begins a secret relationship with Carmen towards the end of season 3, deceiving her into thinking he cared for her, although it later turned out that he only dated Carmen with hopes of getting her into bed and planned to leave her right afterward. In the season 3 finale, he runs away with her and takes $5,000 with him. He is known to date many other girls only for sex, even sleeping with his principal's daughter. However Carmen does not give in when Zack attempts to sleep with her at a hotel, even trying to get her drunk just to do so, which also fails. When he realizes Carmen was not going to give in and sleep with him, he breaks up with her and leaves her in San Francisco at a club before going back home. When he got back to his home town, Mel finds him sleeping on the couch and brings him into the factory to confront a furious George about Carmen's whereabouts. After confessing to leaving Carmen at a nightclub, he runs outside where Benny hits him with a wrench. It is mentioned by Carmen that the reason for Zack's undisciplined behavior stems from his father not being there for him and having a "bitter old drunk" of a mother.

Taylor
Taylor (played by Valeria Andrews) is Carmen's friend. Taylor and Carmen hung out with each other in San Francisco. Taylor is the backup dancer for Chingy.  She helped Carmen pay rent in the episode "Landlord Almighty". Taylor eats Carmen's food, uses her phone, and wears her clothes without permission. George stated Carmen and Taylor's friendship as "Carmen having her own Carmen." Taylor's exit comes when a one-night stand refuses to leave and George tricks her into packing her things and going back to San Francisco to make him think she is leaving, to which it's obvious to everyone but Taylor that he is actually forcing her to leave. Max had a crush on Taylor.

Ricky
Ricky (J.B. Gaynor) is Max's closest friend. Both George and Angie see him as a delinquent; he once stuck a grilled cheese sandwich in George's VCR, he and Max accidentally burned down George's garage after letting Max light off a bottle rocket, and when he and Max skip school and try to take George's car for a joyride, they end up driving it into the backyard. But George and Angie learn that he is enduring a childhood similar to and even somewhat worse than George's: a missing father and a drunken mother. Ernie agrees to foster Ricky- who is capable of managing multiple household tasks- out of necessity: his mother is usually too drunk to do anything. In a later episode, Ernie becomes engaged to Ricky's mother, after she informs Ernie she is pregnant with his child. It is later revealed that the child belongs to someone else, and Ernie's fiancée makes a swift and permanent exit.

Tammy
Tammy (Gigi Rice) is Ricky's alcoholic mother. Ernie dates her and takes care of Ricky for her because of her personal issues. In a later episode Ernie announces that he broke up with Tammy over irreconcilable differences explaining that he "wanted to communicate more and she wanted to have sex with strangers while he [Ernie] was at work".

Piper Morey
Piper (Autumn Reeser) is Carmen's former friend turned nemesis. She is popular, one of the stars of Carmen and Toby's school. Piper and her other cool friends go on a website to post insulting comments; in the episode "Token of Unappreciation", they target Toby. Carmen did not agree, and Piper made Carmen choose to be friends with her or with Toby. Piper invites Carmen and Toby to her party;  and Carmen tells Toby they're only inviting Toby to make fun of her. Carmen and Toby don't go to the party and Carmen and Toby remain best friends. In the episode "Girl Fight" Piper writes "Carmen Hopez" on the sliding door and also wrote "Carmen Cant Say No-pez" on her locker at school because Carmen's ex-boyfriend Adam spread a rumor that he had sex with Carmen. Carmen gets suspended from school when she gets in a fight with Piper. George and Angie fix the problem and the principal revokes Carmen's suspension, suspending Piper. After they tell Carmen she can go back to school now, she refuses, telling them that she's the school whore now after revealing a phone call from boys who were asking if they could leave a message for the school whore. Carmen goes to private school after people keep harassing her, including a guy pulling her shirt up in the hall, and another who follows her into the bathroom and asks her if she wants to have sex with him. George and Angie raise money to send Carmen to private school.

Sylvie Cardenas
Sylvie is Ernie's morbidly obese mother who needs assistance with bathing and dining. She is said to be deeply religious, though she was pregnant with Ernie before marrying his father. Ernie refuses to believe so, even though George says there are pictures of him being breastfed at the reception. George also accidentally saw Sylvie naked as a child. He claimed he "saw one boob through one window and the other boob through the other window." Ernie said: "She likes to air-dry!". She is seen partly on-screen in the episode "George Takes a Sentimental Ernie" due to her appearance. In her first appearance, however, she was shown to be average size and played by Lillian Hurst. However, every appearance after that, the character is never shown and is voiced by a man. Comedian Gabriel Iglesias, whose work is uncredited, used his imitation of his mother's voice.

Mr. Needles
Mr. Needles is the name of the Lopez family dog; mangy and sickly, having contracted a multitude of harsh, often fictional and disgusting, canine ailments. He was purchased from a homeless man who was unable to afford medical treatment for his pet, and was named by Max for the countless injections that the dog required in order to lessen the symptoms of its numerous illnesses. One episode focused on Mr. Needles's development of a deadly, life-threatening tumor that required surgical extraction in order for the dog to receive treatment, which the Lopez family refused in exchange for euthanasia of Mr. Needles in order to lessen his agony. Fortunately the prayers of both Max and George miraculously cured Mr. Needles of his tumor entirely, resulting in George's fulfillment of his vow to crawl up the cobblestones of the Church devoted to Our Lady of Guadalupe in Mexico; in truth George did not wish to do this and only pretended to pray to make Max feel better. Afterward, albeit Mr. Needles' role in the television program was minor, his extensive quantity of ailments receded  however he was mentioned a couple of times during the show saying  that George use a shock to keep mr  needles off the furniture.

Minor characters
Adam Connors (Jordan Masterson) is Carmen's boyfriend in "Love Bites" who gives her a hickey. In "Girl Fight", Carmen breaks up with Adam, so he tells everybody that Carmen had sex with him, causing the whole school to call her a whore and for George and Angie to immediately withdraw her from public school.
Blane McNamara (Stacy Keach) is Jason and Eric's wealthy father. He puts Jason on steroids.
Enrique Vega (Edward James Olmos) is the person that bought the factory from Mel and Jack Powers. He gave complete control of the factory to George.
Ashley (Paris Hilton) is Max's attractive tutor.
Claudia (Dagney Kerr) is George's absent-minded, and sometimes rude secretary from seasons one and two. She disappears from the show for unexplained reasons, and is replaced by Marisol in the middle of season two.
Danny Boy is a lazy Powers Bros. worker who is never seen and is only heard from over the phone. He is also once heard as a fast food drive through worker. He is voiced by George Lopez.
Duncan (Jonathan Jones) is the first boy Carmen dated in the episode "Curious George". He wears his pants sagging. He broke up with Carmen because he only wanted to have sex with her, but Carmen wasn't ready. When Carmen and Duncan are studying in Carmen's room, George thinks that they are having sex, so George sends Max upstairs to spy and Max says that her bedroom door is closed, which makes George think that they are doing it. When Benny sees Carmen and Duncan go up to her room, Benny says that Carmen will be pregnant in a week. Duncan is severely afraid of George when he threatens him.
Frank (Mel Rodriguez) is a coworker and friend of George.  He had his wedding reception at George's place. His job is in jeopardy. He was once in the carpool. In "Max's Big Adventure", George wanted to test Max about safety so Frank tried to lure him in his van. Another kid gets in the van instead and Frank gets busted by the cops, so he quits the carpool.
Jennifer (Brenda Song) is one of the cool girls with Piper Morey, (Autumn Reeser) and Ashley (Carly Schroeder).
Kenzie (played by Hilary Duff) is Carmen's friend. She teaches Carmen about poetry and tells her that she should use her heritage as a "suffering Mexican." She is often overly dramatic in her poetry. Earlier in the show she appeared as Stephanie, Angie's sales tutor from La Marie Cosmetics.
Noah (Johnny Pacar) was a boy who pretended to date Carmen to cover up that she was really seeing Zack. George had a suspicion that Noah was cheating on Carmen when Noah received a text message saying to let them know when he would get rid of Carmen, so George and Benny followed him to the local movie theater. Noah saw A Walk in the Tuscan Meadow. When Benny and George saw a girl sit next to Noah, they thought that she was the one that Noah cheated on Carmen with, until a male teenager sat next to Noah, and the two teens started rapidly kissing, which revealed that Noah was gay.
Olivia (Ashley Tisdale) is Carmen's friend who is only seen in the episode, "I only have Eyes for You," who Max tries to peek at changing before getting sprayed in his eye with perfume when Carmen catches him.
Stephanie (played by Hilary Duff) was introduced when Angie started working at the "La Marie" cosmetics company. She shows Angie ways of persuading customers to buy things. In the beginning, she says that she is 40 (when she is actually only 23) years old, and insists she only looks young because she has been using exfoliators for years. She gets Angie to lure customers by pointing out flaws. However, Angie discovers that using pity works for her.
Toby (played by Rachel Snow) was Carmen's best friend in season 2. In one episode they get into a huge fight with Piper, who was Carmen's mean and popular friend, and called Toby fat.  They later make up, and Carmen and Toby ditch Piper and the other cool and popular girls.  She moves away in "Halloween Cheer" and it devastates Carmen.

Extended Lopez-Palmero family
A major recurring trait throughout the show, Angie's family is seen more than George's family as they greatly hate each other.

Manny Lopez
Manuel "Manny" Lopez (played by William Marquez and portrayed as younger by Amaury Nolasco and Esai Morales) is George, Linda and George II's father, Angie's father-in-law, Benny's ex-husband, Lydia's husband, and Carmen and Max's paternal grandfather. He abandoned Benny and George when George was two and before Linda was born. Because he left Benny, she had to give Linda up for adoption. He was rumored to have died when George was six. When George learned from his Aunt Cecilia that he was alive, he tried to track him down. George found Manny in Phoenix, Arizona, punched him in the face for calling his mother a "cabrona" (Spanish for "Bitch") and was arrested for it a month later. Manny dropped the charges and had George released. George finds out he has a half-brother, also named George, and hears that Manny and his son are poor but he later finds out that Manny owns Lopez Construction and is wealthy. Because of Manny's absence, George sometimes fumbles in his attempts to be a good dad, and he has to figure out for himself what might be the best ways to handle parenting issues. In Would You Like a Drumstick or a Kidney?, George learns from his half-brother that his father needs a new kidney. Manny dies in Momentos, the next episode, before the surgery. Manny wrote a letter to George before he died and requested that neither George or Benny attend his funeral, not wanting to draw negative attention and risk his reputation. Manny also left George his gold watch that his father gave to him (George's paternal grandfather). George is so upset that his father doesn't want him to attend his funeral, that he destroys the watch with a meat mallet. Minutes later, George learns from his mom that the gold watch was worth a fortune. Manny also stole George's birth certificate when he left him and Benny and used it to legalize the second George, who was born in Mexico.

Joe Diaz
Joseph "Joe" Diaz (Ismael 'East' Carlo) is George's and Linda's deceased uncle, Angie's uncle-in-law, Carmen and Max's great-uncle, and Benny's big brother. Uncle Joe once appeared to have an oversized bump on his neck which is so huge George claims "It looks like you're growing a second head!" to which Joe replies, "Who told you?" Benny calls it a neck wallet. It's possible that he died because of this because it is mentioned to be serious. Joe seemed to have a lot of money because of how Benny described him not sacrificing $20 for her. When they meet again, Joe only gives Benny a $10. Joe and Benny argue about how he owed her $20, while George subtly takes a $20 out of his pocket and drops it on the floor, exclaiming "Oh, look what fell out of Joe's pocket." Joe picks up George's $20, disagrees with him about the money being his, and walks out.  He and Benny were estranged for fifteen years over a foolish grudge, but George convinces his mom to see Joe and get "closure" before he dies.  He is believed to be a Super Bowl fan, because he always has tickets. But before he dies, he gives Benny the tickets. Joe appears and dies in the episode "Super Bowl".

Linda Lorenzo-Lopez
Linda Lorenzo (played by Lisa Guerrero in episode "Feel the Burn" and by Eva LaRue in episodes "George Gets Assisterance"
and "George's Relatively Bad Idea") is George's successful, long-lost sister who he never knew about until the episode "Feel the Burn", Benny and Manny's daughter, Angie's sister-in-law, Oscar Lopez's niece and Carmen and Max's Aunt. Benny couldn't afford to keep both her and George, so she gave her up for adoption. George finally gets to meet her for the first time at a Valley School district meeting in the episode "Feel the Burn". She and Vic shortly get together when Vic pays George $2,000 dollars to take to a party his workmates were having much to Angie's and George's disgust due to how she was one of the family basically. She soon says that George couldn't tell her whom to date but soon breaks up with Vic when she finds out how he kissed Benny, her mother, and gently tells him it'd be best if they just stayed friends.

Other relatives
Dr. Emilina Palmero (Sônia Braga) is Ray, Gloria, and Angie's deceased mother, George's mother-in-law, Vic's ex-wife, and Veronica, Carmen, and Max's grandmother. She is a dermatologist.  She and Vic divorced after Vic discovered she was cheating on him. She only appears in one episode in which it is inferred that she is using Vic. Upon finding out about the affair, Angie tries to invite her over hoping she and Vic can reconcile and they could be a family again, but she cancels upon which Angie tells her mother she'll never forgive her for. When Vic announces to Emilina that he's engaged, she then insists that she wants to get back together begging him to take her back. In season six she and Vic were about to get back together right before she died. In the episode	"George's Grave Mistake Sends Him to a Funeral, Holmes," Emilina died of a heart attack. Angie's last conversation with her is reflected in the episode of her death. Emilina is mentioned often throughout the show by either Vic or George. George often uses Vic's situation with her to make him feel bad when he mocks him.
Cecilia Lopez (Olga Merediz) is George and Linda's aunt, Manny's sister, and Benny's ex-sister in law. She hadn't seen Benny for a long time and in the second season she said she had lost touch with Manny two years before. When she bumped into Benny and George in a SuperStore, she was surprised to see Benny again (when Benny saw Cecilia she ran away) and happy to see George. She told George that his father was still alive, and came to his house to give him a photo of Manny holding the infant George. She appeared in the episode Who's your Daddy.
Gloria Palmero (Jacqueline Obradors) is Vic and Emilina's youngest daughter, Angie and Ray's sister, George and Claudia's sister-in-law, Carmen, Max and Veronica's aunt, Octavio and Lynette's niece. She was estranged with Angie until Angie's birthday. After announcing her divorce, she flirts with George and soon even attempts to hook up with him, kissing him in his garage (which Max witnesses through the door window leaving him shocked). Though its soon told that she only kissed him because she was jealous of Angie's loving relationship with him. After Angie finds out about what she did, she gets into a huge fight with her (with Angie telling George after the fight that "...and I gave her her hair back!")
Ray Palmero (Andy García) is Angie and Gloria's older brother, Vic and Emilina's son, Claudia's ex-husband, Octavio and Lynette's nephew and Veronica's estranged father. He is known for conning family members and others out of money, most notably his father. He attempts to do the same with daughter Veronica's inheritance, but is stopped by George. He really does love his daughter, but is too messed-up to be a good father. It is possible he is in jail because George connected some road flares to a timer and put them in his suitcase which went off at the airport to get back at him for all the conning he has done over the years.
Claudia Palmero (Maria Canals) is Veronica's deceased millionaire mother, Ray's ex-wife, Angie and George's ex-sister-in-law, and Emilina and Vic's ex-daughter-in-law. She left Veronica all her money in her will if George decided she was responsible enough to have it. During her funeral, when her recorded will was played she tells Vic off "...will Vic Palmero please come to the stand ?; OK now bend over and kiss George Lopez's ass because I pick him!" George, who was eating at the buffet at her funeral, couldn't help rubbing it in; "You heard her Vic! Kiss it! Kiss it!" Claudia choose George because, unlike the rest of the family, he had gone through harder times in his life. Her will is later challenged, freezing the trust fund for her daughter.
Lindsay Cafferty (played by Stacy Keibler) was Vic's young fiancée. She is very pretty, and much taller than Vic, plus she's not so bright when she let it slip about Angie's supposed pregnancy. When she lies she rubs her earrings. When thought Lindsay was cheating on Vic, George called the show Cheaters. They found her kissing a man much younger than Vic and around her age.
George Edward Lopez II (Lou Diamond Phillips) is George and Linda's half-brother on their father's side, Angie's half-brother-in-law and Carmen and Max's half-uncle. He appears in two episodes, the first revealing him to have been raised in wealth; however, due to blowing his money, he attempts to use George for financial purposes. He helps George get in touch with Manny to make up, and later he comes to Thanksgiving dinner and tells his big brother that their father needs a kidney transplant. His mother is Manny's second wife, Lydia Lopez. They have a dog in which Manny named after Benny.
Octavio Palmero (Bert Rosario) is Angie's uncle and Vic's brother. George helped Vic get him out of Cuba for Angie's anniversary.  He and Vic share an equal hatred for Fidel Castro, of which George took advantage, pranking them by barging into the house while Vic and Octavio were trash-talking about Castro in a Castro-like costume, scaring them both.
Lydia Lopez (Cristina Saralegui) is Manny's second wife, George and Linda's step-mother, George II's mother, Angie's step-mother-in-law and Carmen and Max's step-grandmother. She is first seen in George Has Two Mommies, and returns to attend Thanksgiving dinner. She appears to be very kind, but untrusting of those Manny does not trust (Benny). She primarily owns the dog Benny, keeping it in her purse.
Aunt Lynette (Connie Ramirez) is Angie's aunt. She is one of the many who look down on George and are horrified to discover George was left in charge of Veronica's inheritance.
Wayne Hill (played by Jerry Springer) is a former boyfriend of Benny.  He was framed by George and Ernie thirty years ago, as they placed Sylvie's bra in Wayne's leather jacket to make Benny believe he was cheating on her. In one episode George told Wayne that Benny was dead in order to lure him away from Benny and he told Benny that Wayne was dead in order for her to forget about Wayne but in the end Benny and Wayne found out the truth. In the last episode they are seen together, suggesting that they will have a relationship into the future.
Uncle Oscar is George's other uncle. He is an unseen character and was mentioned once in the series in "George's Dog Days of Bummer". It is also noted that he is a homeless alcoholic.
Richard is Angie's sister's ex-husband, Veronica, Carmen and Max's former uncle, George and Angie's ex-brother-in-law, and Emilina and Vic's ex-son-in-law.  It is revealed in the episode "A Kiss is Just a Kiss" that he and Gloria got divorced after being married for two years.  He is an unseen character.
 Benny Lopez is Manny and Lydia's dog. She is named after Manny's first wife and George's mother.
Luisa Diaz (Rita Moreno) is Benny and Joe's estranged mother, George and Linda's grandmother and Max and Carmen's great-grandmother. Throughout the series, Benny said her mother abused her, which was confirmed when Luisa came to town to defend Benny in trial. She says that she and Benny's father never laid a finger on Benny, which Benny disclosed as a lie and lashed out at her in court. It became revealed of how coldly Luisa had treated Benny, it helped George come to realize that Benny actually did do better as a parent. When she left, George said to Benny (to cheer her up) "Damn! I think some flowers just died when she went past them."

George Lopez
George Lopez